South Wheatley is a hamlet between Canworthy Water and Maxworthy in Cornwall, England, United Kingdom.

References

Hamlets in Cornwall